Kenneth Edward Bailey (born March 28, 1986), better known by his stage name Young Scooter, is an American rapper who is affiliated with Freebandz and 1017 Brick Squad Records and CEO of his own label Black Migo Gang. Scooter grew to prominence in 2012 after releasing a number of successful mixtapes and collaborating with notable rappers such as Gucci Mane, Future, Waka Flocka Flame and Chief Keef. His mixtape Street Lottery received positive reviews and was certified gold on popular mixtape site DatPiff. It was placed at number 24 on SPINs 40 Best Hip-Hop Albums of 2013.

Life and career 
Scooter was born in Walterboro, South Carolina. When he was nine, his family moved to the Kirkwood Community (a.k.a. Lil Mexico) of Atlanta, GA.  In 2008, after he was charged with drug trafficking, he decided to start pursuing a career in music. Scooter is a childhood friend with fellow Atlanta rapper Future.

While his first mixtape Plug Talkin didn't receive much attention, with his second release Finessin and Flexin he made a name for himself, already collaborating with Future. Scooter put out 2 more mixtapes in 2012 – Married to the Streets and Voice of the Streetz, featuring production from Zaytoven, DJ Spinz, Nard & B, Da Honorable C.N.O.T.E. and guest verses by Gucci Mane and Alley Boy.

Scooter's real breakthrough came in January 2013, when he released his mixtape Street Lottery. SPIN named it "Rap release of the week" and XXL featured it on its "Best mixtapes of January" list. Eric Diep of XXL called Scooter "one of the hottest street rappers coming out of Atlanta" and wrote that tracks like the single "Colombia" and "Street Lottery" (featuring Bun B) are "proof of his undeniable talent". The tape was also a viral success gaining over 100,000 downloads on DatPiff. The official video for "Colombia", directed by Decatur Dan, premiered on MTV on January 31. The song became a hit in the south, especially in Scooter's hometown Atlanta. Brandon Soderberg of SPIN classified it as a mix of Rick Ross' "Hustlin'" and Future's "Tony Montana". By the end of the month, an official remix with rappers Rick Ross, Birdman and Gucci Mane was released. Lil Wayne also covered the song for his mixtape Dedication 5. The rapper's recent success prompted OnSmash to state "the buzz for Scooter is at an all-time high." On April 8, Scooter was arrested for violation of parole.

Scooter's collaboration mixtape with Gucci Mane Free Bricks 2 was released on February 28, 2013. On August 29, 2013, Young Scooter released his mixtape From The Cell Block To Your Block, featuring guest appearances from Future, Gucci Mane, Wale, YG, Lil Boosie, Webbie and Lil Phat, among others.

Musical style 
Scooter is known for his freestyle type of rapping, without writing down his lyrics, similarly to Gucci Mane. He has defined his style as "count music," and explained it in an interview with Complex: "I don't really care what I say on a beat as long as it's about some money. When you try to think hard and write it out, that's when it's gonna be fucked up."

Scooter's lyrical themes are largely about money and drugs. David Drake of Complex compared his "populist, kingpin rapping" to that of Young Jeezy, although he noted that Scooter doesn't have the "all-encompassing grandiosity" of his fellow Atlanta rapper.

Scooter is influenced by famous hip-hop artists such as Jay-Z, 50 Cent and Diddy.

Legal issues 
Young Scooter was arrested for probation violation during a traffic stop in DeKalb County, Georgia, on April 8, 2013. According to HipHopDX, Scooter shared a jail cell with frequent collaborator Gucci Mane, who was arrested for probation violation on April 12, 2013. Scooter spent six months behind bars before being released in mid-October 2013. On March 2, 2015, Young Scooter was released off probation.

Discography

Mixtapes

Singles

As lead artist

As featured artist

Other charted songs

Guest appearances

Music videos

As lead artist

As featured artist

References

External links 
 

 Trick Scooter

American rappers
1986 births
1017 Brick Squad artists
African-American male rappers
Living people
People from Walterboro, South Carolina
People from DeKalb County, Georgia
Rappers from Atlanta
Rappers from South Carolina
Southern hip hop musicians
21st-century American rappers
21st-century American male musicians
21st-century African-American musicians
20th-century African-American people